Lenton is a hamlet in the district of South Kesteven, Lincolnshire, England.

Village
The village is sometimes known as Lavington, and the name may have come from the Old English Lâfa, and the characteristic suffix -ton. The village  is listed in the Domesday Book as "Lavintone".

Lenton parish church is dedicated to St Peter.

The ecclesiastical parish is part of the North Beltisloe Group of parishes in the Deanery of Beltisloe in the Diocese of Lincoln.  From 2006 to 2011 the incumbent was The Revd Richard Ireson, who was succeeded by The Revd Mike Doyle in 2012.

The village erected a new Lychgate to mark the Millennium. A previous exhibition to raise funds for the church, The Host of Angels Experience, returned in 2012.

Lavington Lake is a local fishing facility.

Other hamlets in the area are Hanby, Keisby Osgodby and Pickworth. Larger villages close by include Ropsley, Folkingham and Ingoldsby.

Lost villages
The village is associated with the site of the lost medieval settlement of Little Lavington,  to the north-east.

South of the village is the site of the lost settlement of Osgodby whose name survives in the name of the parish.

Notable people
 Edward Bradley – vicar of Lenton in the 1870s; under the pen name Cuthbert Bede, writer and illustrator of The Adventures of Mr. Verdant Green, the story of an Oxford University undergraduate.
 The village is the burial place of the first and second baronets both called Sir William Armyne. They were both leading puritans in Lincolnshire and supporters of the Parliamentary cause in the Civil War.

References

External links

"Lenton"; Homepages.which.net. Retrieved 21 April 2012

Hamlets in Lincolnshire
South Kesteven District